The Morehead State Eagles are the athletic teams that represent Morehead State University (MSU), located in Morehead, Kentucky, United States, in intercollegiate sports as a member of the NCAA Division I ranks (for football, the Football Championship Subdivision), primarily competing in the Ohio Valley Conference (OVC) since the 1948–49 academic year; while its football team competes in the Pioneer Football League (PFL). The Eagles previously competed in the Kentucky Intercollegiate Athletic Conference (KIAC; now currently known as the River States Conference (RSC) since the 2016–17 school year) of the National Association of Intercollegiate Athletics (NAIA) from 1933–34 to 1947–48; and in the defunct West Virginia Intercollegiate Athletic Conference (WVIAC) from 1929–30 to 1932–33.

Mascot and colors
The eagle mascot is named Beaker, and the school colors are blue and gold.

Varsity teams
Morehead State competes in 17 intercollegiate varsity sports: Men's sports baseball, basketball, cross country, football, golf and track & field; while women's include basketball, beach volleyball, cross country, golf, soccer, softball, track & field and volleyball; and co-ed sports include cheerleading, dance and rifle.

With 2017–18 being its initial season and the OVC not yet sponsoring the sport, the beach volleyball team will compete as an independent. The football team competes as a member of the Pioneer Football League, a non-scholarship Division I (FCS) league.

CBI results
The Eagles have appeared in the College Basketball Invitational (CBI) three times. Their combined record is 5–4.

Notable athletes

References

External links